Emmett Park is a multi-use stadium in Kingston, Jamaica adjacent to Sabina Park.  It is currently used mostly for football matches. It served as a home ground of Waterhouse F.C. The stadium holds 4,000 people.

External links
Aerial view
Photos: Pavilion Pitch (with a Sabina Park stand in the background).

References

Football venues in Jamaica
Sport in Kingston, Jamaica
Buildings and structures in Kingston, Jamaica